"Where I'm Headed" is the eight track on Norwegian singer-songwriter Lene Marlin's debut studio album, Playing My Game (1999). Written by Marlin and produced by Hans G and Jørn Dahl, the song was released as the album's third single in late 1999 following Marlin's international breakthrough hit, "Sitting Down Here".

Despite not charting in Marlin's native Norway, the single became a top-10 success in Finland, France, and Italy, peaking at numbers seven, five, and two, respectively. In France, it became Marlin's highest-charting single, earned a gold sales certification, and was ranked number 38 on the Syndicat National de l'Édition Phonographique (SNEP) year-end chart of 1999, selling 300,000 copies there by January 2000. When released in the United Kingdom in 2001, it peaked at number 31 on the UK Singles Chart.

Composition
With a duration of four minutes and eleven seconds, "Where I'm Headed" is composed in the key of D major with a tempo of 120 beats per minute.

Critical reception
Geir Rakvaag from Norwegian newspaper Dagsavisen called "Where I'm Headed", along with "Unforgivable Sinner" and "Sitting Down Here", one of the "catchiest" songs on the album.

Track listings

Norwegian maxi-CD single
 "Where I'm Headed" – 4:13
 "Where I'm Headed" (instrumental) – 4:13
 "The Way We Are" (live at Sound Republic) – 4:49

European CD single
 "Where I'm Headed" – 4:13
 "Where I'm Headed" (instrumental) – 4:13

UK CD and cassette single
 "Where I'm Headed" (Phil Bodger Remix edit) – 3:42
 "Where I'm Headed" – 4:11
 "So I See" – 4:49

Charts

Weekly charts

Year-end charts

Certifications

|}

Release history

References

1999 singles
1999 songs
Lene Marlin songs
Virgin Records singles